"Time Is on My Side" is a song written by Jerry Ragovoy (using the pseudonym "Norman Meade"). First recorded by jazz trombonist Kai Winding and his orchestra in 1963, it was covered (with additional lyrics by Jimmy Norman) by both soul singer Irma Thomas and then later the Rolling Stones in 1964.

Kai Winding
Session arranger Garry Sherman contacted friend and colleague Ragovoy after Winding had expressed an interest in going in a more commercial and rhythmic direction. Ragovoy had thought of no lyrics for the song other than "time is on my side". Produced by Creed Taylor and engineered by Phil Ramone, and including background vocals by Cissy Houston, Dionne Warwick, and Dee Dee Warwick, the recording was released on the Verve Records label in October 1963.

Irma Thomas rendition

In early 1964, Irma Thomas recorded a R&B cover of the song as the B-side for her single "Anyone Who Knows What Love Is (Will Understand)", released on Imperial Records. Songwriter Jimmy Norman was enlisted by the arranger H. B. Barnum to create some more lyrics for the song, which at that time consisted only of the words "Time is on my side" and "You'll come runnin' back." He managed to finish moments before Thomas entered the studio to record it.  Produced by Eddie Ray, Thomas' version of "Time Is on My Side" provided the inspiration for the title of her 1996 greatest hits release Time Is on My Side.

Rolling Stones versions

The Rolling Stones recorded two versions of the song in 1964. The first version (a looser arrangement featuring a briefer, organ-only intro), recorded in London in June 1964, was released as a single in the US, on September 25, 1964, and was included the following month on their US album 12 X 5; that version became the band's first top ten hit in the United States. The second version (more tightly arranged and featuring guitar in the intro), recorded in Chicago on November 8, 1964, was released in the UK on January 15, 1965, on The Rolling Stones No. 2 The later recording is the version that receives the most airplay and appears on most "best of" compilations. Both versions incorporate elements of Irma Thomas's recording, including spoken-word interjections in the chorus, a monologue in the middle of the song, and distinctive lead guitar.  Cash Box described it as a "throbbing rhythm affair" with "an effective mid-deck recitation."

The single peaked at number six on the US Billboard Pop Singles Chart to become the Rolling Stones' first top ten hit in the US. Their previous single, "It's All Over Now", had peaked at number 26.

A live version of the song from the band's 1982 live album, Still Life, reached number 62 in the UK Singles Chart.

Personnel
 Mick Jagger – lead vocals and tambourine
 Keith Richards – lead guitar and backing vocals
 Brian Jones – rhythm guitar and backing vocals
 Bill Wyman – bass and backing vocals
 Charlie Watts – drums
 Ian Stewart – Vox Continental organ

Charts

Recordings by other artists

"Time Is on My Side" has since been covered by artists such as Indexi, Michael Bolton, Cat Power, Hattie Littles, Blondie, Wilson Pickett, Brian Poole and the Tremeloes, the O'Jays, the Pretty Things, Lorraine Ellison, Paul Revere and the Raiders, Kim Wilson, Tracy Nelson, Patti Smith, Andrés Calamaro (for his "El Salmón", a CD with 103 songs), and the Moody Blues (in 1965 and on the 1985 re-release of The Magnificent Moodies).

Pop singer and pianist Vanessa Carlton recorded a version of the song for a Time Warner digital video recorders commercial, which also served as promotion for her second album, Harmonium (2004), and received heavy rotation on US television during early 2005. The newspaper Metroland reviewed her rendition of the song negatively, and wrote, "we tend to think time is most definitely not on her side — how else to explain the near-universal apathy to the release of her second album, Harmonium?" Harmonium was not re-issued to include the song.

In 2004, Jimmy Norman, who wrote the lyrics to "Time is on My Side" but whose name was eventually removed from credits, recorded it for the first time as the last track on his album Little Pieces.

In 2007, British soul singer Beverley Knight recorded a version of the song featuring Ronnie Wood for her fifth studio album, Music City Soul.

References

Sources
 

1963 singles
1964 singles
Songs written by Jerry Ragovoy
Irma Thomas songs
The Rolling Stones songs
Vanessa Carlton songs
The Moody Blues songs
Decca Records singles
London Records singles
Song recordings produced by Andrew Loog Oldham
Song recordings produced by Jagger–Richards
1963 songs
Verve Records singles
Imperial Records singles